Alexander Robertson & Sons was a boatyard in Sandbank, Argyll and Bute, Scotland, from 1876 to 1980. The yard was located on the shore of the Holy Loch, not far from the Royal Clyde Yacht Club (RCYC) at Hunters Quay, in the building that is now the Royal Marine Hotel, which was the epicentre of early Clyde yachting. Alexander Robertson started repairing boats in a small workshop at Sandbank in 1876, and went on to become one of the foremost wooden boat-builders on Scotland's River Clyde.  The "golden years" of Robertson's yard were in the early 1900s, when it started building some of the first IYRU 12mR & 15mR (Metre Class) racing yachts. Robertson's was well known for the quality of its workmanship and was chosen to build the first 15-metre yacht designed by William Fife III (Shimna, 1907). More than 55 boats were built by Robertson's in preparation for the First World War and the yard remained busy even during the Great Depression in the 1930s as many wealthy businessmen developed a passion for yacht racing on the Clyde. During World War II the yard was devoted to Admiralty work, producing a wide range of large high-speed Fairmile Marine Motor Boats. After the war, the yard built the successful one-class Loch Longs and two 12-metre challengers for the America's Cup: Sceptre (1958) and Sovereign (1964).  Due to difficult business conditions, the Robertson family sold the yard in 1965, and it was turned over to glass-reinforced plastic production work until it closed in 1980. During its 104-year history, Robertson's Yard built 482 numbered boats, many of which are still sailing today.

History of Robertson's Yard

Alexander Robertson (1851-1937) 

Alexander Robertson, the son of a crofter/fisherman from Tarskavaig on the Isle of Skye, was born in Inverkip on 29 August 1851.  Following the catastrophic potato blight on Skye in 1846, Alexander's father left Tarskavaig to seek a better life fishing on the River Clyde. After his parents moved to Sandbank in 1859 to run the village Post Office, his father taught him to sail and look after boats. He then served his apprenticeship as a boatbuilder in Dunoon and Govan.  In 1876, at the age of 25, he teamed up with Daniel Kerr to build small boats at his workshop in Sandbank.  The partnership was dissolved in 1878, and Robertson went on to acquire larger premises in order to expand the business.  He initially designed many of the yachts and launches himself, but in later years used many leading designers of the day to carry out work on the larger boats.  Robertson remained chairman of the company until 1935, two years before his death.

Robertson not only provided a significant source of employment in Sandbank, but he also played an important part in the local community.  He made notable contributions in a number of areas, including: Argyll County Councillor, representing Cowal; Parish Councillor; justice of the peace; member of the school board; director of Dunoon District Cottage Hospital; on the board of management of the Parish Church and he was also responsible for organising many social gatherings in the village hall.  He also took a very keen interest in yacht racing in the Holy Loch, even in his later years.

Early years 

By the age of 16, Robertson had started work as an apprentice with the Dunoon boatbuilder Ewen Sutherland, who came from a family of boatbuilders in Portree on the Isle of Skye. After his initial training, further experience was acquired at Alexander Stephen and Sons Ltd. of Linthouse, one of the main Govan yards. In 1876, Robertson, at the age of 25, teamed up with Daniel Kerr to form Robertson & Kerr, Boat Builders and Carpenters.  The initial boats built in their small workshop were modest 'clinker' craft and fishing skiffs, but they also carried out repairs, hired and stored boats, laid moorings and even earned money from fishing. This workshop was located in the grounds of his parents' Post Office (now Eckvale) near the old primary school. On 17 October 1878, the Robertson & Kerr partnership was dissolved when Daniel Kerr accepted a job with the Clyde Lighthouse Trust.

Robertson continued working at the small workshop for several years, for the most part repairing boats. The land was purchased in 1879 and the first shed constructed in 1880. By 1887 the first phase of development of the site had been completed, and Robertson had the largest number of yachts (47) under his charge of any yard in Scotland. Construction of a slipway, to launch larger boats (greater than 25 ft), was held up for several years (1887–1892) because of the proposed plans to build the Clyde Ardrishaig and Crinan Railway, which would have passed through the yard.

Golden years 

A proper boat-numbering system was introduced at the new 'distillery' site in 1889 and every detail relating to cost was recorded in large ledgers.  Boat No 1 was a  cutter designed by Robertson for John Dobbie of Dunoon, named Cowal Lass.  Boat No 3 was the Fairlie, a  cutter designed by William Fife III for A. Currie of Sandbank in 1890.  (This was the start of a long relationship with the famous Fife yard at Fairlie, and over the years Robertsons built eleven Fife-designed yachts.) A  cutter, Verve, designed by George Lennox Watson in 1892, was the first of many to be built at the yard. The 1894  G L Watson designed Gaff cutter Camilla is the oldest known Robertson yacht still sailing, and is based at Rhu. The Alfred Mylne-designed boats did not commence until 1900, with two , 19/24 Clyde class sloops, the Valmai and the Susette. The Mylne family owned the  Mylne-Robertson cutter Medea (Ex Vladimir) for over thirty years.

In April 1893, Robertson leased an acre of land on the "foreshore and seabed" from the Board of Trade for a period of 31 years, with a rent of £2 per annum. Permission included the rights to extend the yard and build a slip, dock and wharf. The new slipway and pier were built in 1893, in time for wintering the boats at the end of the season. With an estimated cost of £4,000 to £5,000, this was one of the most important investments in Clyde yachting. It was reported in the New York Times, on 14 December 1895, that "In Robertson's yard, Sandbank, Clyde, about 100 craft have been taken ashore for the Winter...". This confirms the significant growth of the business as a result of the new slipway.

The yard became renowned for its quality tenders which were built for large steamships launched further up the river.  It appears that the first such order was for a set of four boats for Mr Ninian B Stewart's new  steel steam screw schooner Maria, designed by G L Watson, and built in 1896. (No Yard Number for boats, no yard reference. Source: Yachtsman magazine, 5 March 1896).

By 1900 most of the infrastructure required for the production of high-calibre wooden boats was in place: pier, slipway, sawmills, workshops, building-sheds, stores, paint shop, engine house, sail loft and workers' houses.

 

Elrhuna, a  sloop was designed by Alexander in 1904, and due to the quality of the wood and sound construction she still races. Elrhuna (Boat No 35) is the oldest yacht still sailing which was both designed and built by Alexander Robertson. She was referred to as the "Wee Britannia" after the Royal Yacht Britannia, due to her graceful lines and sleek black hull.

The first of many motor boats were built in 1905, among them a luxurious  teak-built 'carvel' motor launch ordered for the S Y Nahma, which was the last boat designed by George Lennox Watson. The development of early steam boats by Alexander provided the necessary expertise to build 7 steam-powered launches for the Admiralty in the years leading up to World War I.

When the exciting new 'Metre' class of racing yacht was introduced in 1907 competition became fierce and every year vast sums of money were spent by wealthy enthusiasts to have the latest, fastest, and most beautiful yacht on the Clyde. These were the golden years of the yard, during which they built some of the earliest metre-class classic racing yachts: 15-metre Shimna (later Slec) (Willian Fife III, 1907); 15-metre Tritonia (later Jeano, Cisne Branco and Albatroz - Alfred Mylne, 1910), 12-metre Heatherbell (Thomas Glen-Coats, 1907) - Heatherbell represented Finland in the 1912 Helsinki Summer Olympics; 12-metre Cyra (Alfred Mylne, 1909) - note : renamed Arcula around 1934 and destroyed by the Wehrmacht 1943 or 1944 who killed the owner Frits Johannsen (DK); 10-metre Pampero (1912); 8-metre Novena (1908); 5-metre Mungo (1908).

Robertson's Yard was exceptionally busy in 1908.  As well as four racing yachts, one large motor launch and several tenders under construction, they had plenty of hollow-spar work and major modifications to the yacht Susanne.  The yard employed seventy men and they had to work overtime to keep up with the ambitious building programme.  Many alterations were made to the yard and they had a new building shed with  headroom and a  moulding-loft.  The yard was now capable of building yachts of any size, and it was hoped some 23-metre work would follow.

Robertson was a rather astute businessman so, as the yard was booming in the early 1900s, he began buying up properties along the shore of the Holy Loch to stop other boat yards being built.

The wars 
Over 55 boats were built by Robertson's in preparation for the First World War, and after the war the yard started to diversify and fit-out larger yachts. The company had been run by Robertson for many years, but now three of his sons were helping to run the family business. In 1922 Robertson decided to re-structure the organisation so it could be operated without him in the future. Alexander Robertson & Sons (Yachtbuilders) Limited was formally established on 5 August 1922 to "carry out all aspects of designing, building and repair of yachts, sale of yachts and sail making". Four of Robertson's sons helped to run the business in later years: Archibald; Alexander (Alec); Donald; and George. The fifth son James trained as a Naval Architect and worked for Lloyd's Register of Shipping, making a significant contribution to the restoration of the famous tea clipper Cutty Sark, which is proudly on display in London.

Robertson's Yard was now looking for a new designer and by the end of 1929 David Boyd had replied to an advertisement in the Glasgow Herald.  In 1937 he designed the sleek 6-metre racing yacht Circe, which was described by many as the most successful racing yacht ever produced by the yard.  J. Herbert Thom, one of the Clyde's best helmsmen sailed the yacht with tremendous success in America in 1938 and brought back the 'Seawanhaka Cup', which was successfully defended in home waters the following year. Circe was considered such an advanced design that in 1952 she represented Russia in the Helsinki Summer Olympics.

 
Archibald Robertson was the senior director in the company and destined to take over operation of the yard before he died in November 1929. Alexander remained chairman of the company until June 1935, when he was 84. Even after that he maintained a keen interest in the operation and was often first at the yard in the morning to see the men get started. He died on 15 February 1937 at the family home, 'Tarskavaig', named after the small crofting village on the Isle of Skye.

The first order for a lifeboat from the Royal National Lifeboat Institute (RNLI) was secured by the yard in 1935. The Charlotte Elizabeth was the first motor-powered lifeboat launched in Scotland, and was later stationed in Port Askaig, Islay: she now lies abandoned by Thurso Harbour in Caithness (correct as of 13 Jun 2009).

The Sir Arthur Rose was proudly displayed in the RNLI pavilion at the 1938 Empire Exhibition in Bellahouston Park, Glasgow between May and October. The lifeboat was officially named by Mrs F.O. Laing, daughter of Sir Arthur, on 11 August 1939 and sailed to the Isle of Iona for blessing on the same day.  Orders for a total of 11 lifeboats were received, several of which came back for regular servicing. 

During the 1930s many gigs (or tenders) were built for larger boats launched further up the Clyde, among them the SY Nahlin.  A luxury  motor launch was built for the owner of the SY Nahlin, along with a motor tender for the crew, two lifeboats and two dinghies.  During the renovation of the S Y Nahlin, by the new owner Sir James Dyson, a new owner's launch was built from the original plans in 2009 and the crew's launch was rebuilt in 2008 by Henwood & Dean of Henley-on-Thames.

Several larger boats were also built during this impressive pre-war period: Caretta,  twin screw motor launch designed by Messrs G L Watson in 1927;  Ron,  ketch designed by J A McCallum in 1928;  Southern Cross,  ketch designed by G L Watson in 1930;  Zigeuner,  yawl designed by David Boyd in 1935.

The specially fitted-out 'oceangoing' cruiser  Southern Cross left Robertson's Yard on 26 October 1930 and set sail on a 3-year round-the-world trip, arriving at Brisbane in October 1931.  On the return leg her owner, the tobacco heir D Guthrie Dunn who was a member of the RCYC, was lost overboard near St Helena.  The yacht was brought back to Robertson's Yard by a new crew on 8 July 1933, where she was refitted and sold on. D Guthrie Dunn's cousin Miss E Mathieson donated a silver model of Southern Cross to the Ayr Yacht Club around 1965 which was used as a trophy for the famous Ailsa Craig offshore yacht race.  This sturdy cruiser is still sailing in the Mediterranean and based near Barcelona.

During the Second World War the yard was devoted to Admiralty work.  A total of 23 fast Fairmile Marine motor boats were launched during the war: Fairmile A motor launch,  triple screw (1); Fairmile B motor launch,  twin screw (7); Fairmile C motor gun boat,  triple screw (3); Fairmile D motor torpedo boat,  quadruple screw (12).  Some of the boats returned for servicing during the war, and many others were repaired or modified for the Admiralty.

A number of Robertson-built Fairmile boats had distinguished war records: ML-160 was lead vessel in the starboard column during Operation Chariot, the St Nazaire Raid on the heavily defended German dry dock and naval base in March 1942; many of the boats took part in Operation Overlord, the invasion of Normandy; and several of these high speed launches were engaged in top secret operations in the Mediterranean. MTB 625 and MTB 653 were built for the Royal Norwegian Navy and famously took part in the secretive 30th MTB Flotilla operations out of Lerwick. MTB 718 was launched at the yard in 1944 as part of the secretive 15th Motor Gun Boat Flotilla operating out of Dartmouth and carried out clandestine operations in France and Norway towards the end of the war. The crew named their boat Lone Wolf because most of her top secret operations were carried out independently.

Sailing in the Clyde area was restricted during the war, although the Holy Loch appears to have been an unrestricted area in March 1940.  The Clyde racing fleet did not make its official appearance after the war until 25 May 1946.  Due to the shortage of materials the cost of building a new yacht had increased by 50% between 1939 and 1945.

Winds of change 
Boatbuilding and yachting in particular changed direction dramatically after the war.  Larger boats with crews all but disappeared and they were gradually replaced by more economical cruising and racing yachts.  The 'one-off' design/building work that the yard specialised in was replaced by 'one-design' yachts, which began with Uffa Fox's Flying Fifteens in 1948 and the successful Loch Longs in 1949.

In September 1956 a Royal Yacht Squadron syndicate was formed to build a 12-metre for the 1958 America's Cup. The challenger was selected based on model tank testing and David Boyd's second design was chosen.  In October 1957 Sceptre was beginning to take shape at Robertson's yard in Sandbank. She was officially launched on 2 April 1958. Some initial testing took place in the Holy Loch, but more extensive trials were carried out in the Solent before she was shipped to America. The Sceptre lost to the New York Yacht Club yacht Columbia in September 1958.

The luxuriously appointed  Lone Fox was built in early 1957, in the same shed as Sceptre, and was Colonel W. H. (Bill) Whitbread's personal yacht for a quarter of a century. Colonel Whitbread was head of the well-known brewery firm, and sponsor of the famous round-the-world race. She later won many races in California, and competed regularly in the Caribbean Classic yacht races. Lone Fox took top honours in the 2011 Antigua Classic Regatta winning; class, fleet, and fastest overall boat. Duran Duran presented the Panerai Trophy to Lone Fox for fastest time in the 2012 Antigua Classic Sailing Regatta.

During the late 1950s major business problems started to appear, and during a slow period the yard found work building fast launches for the RAF. They undertook fixed-price contracts for two 63-foot General Service Mk 1 Pinnaces, but delays, design changes and escalating cost of materials put the yard in financial difficulties. At the AGM held on 4 June 1963, discussion took place regarding the adverse outcomes of these contracts, and it was agreed efforts should be made to sell the yard.

Shortly before Sovereign was laid down, Robertson & Sons produced one of the finest Loch Long One Design Class yachts, Ariel, number 87. Which was referred to in the Glasgow Herald in 1993.

David Boyd was again chosen to design a new 12-metre challenger for the 1964 Americas Cup. The Sovereign was launched on 6 June 1963, but by August the Royal Thames Yacht Club Committee was anxious about her performance and David Boyd was asked to design another boat similar to Sovereign, which was named Kurrewa V. Before the two yachts left British waters they conducted trial races in May/June 1964 and the Sovereign was officially selected as the challenger. Although the New York Yacht Club yacht Constellation won the America's Cup off Newport, Rhode Island, Sovereign was much admired for her graceful lines and teak deck.

In addition to the financial losses building the two RAF Pinnaces, the much anticipated work following the three high-profile 12-metre projects failed to materialize. The Robertson family finally sold the yard in 1965 for £27,750, and it became a subsidiary of the Auchinleck Investment Co of Glasgow (comprising a syndicate of 5 well-known Clyde yachtsmen), essentially ending wooden boat-building there.

GRP production 
The prototype for the new fibreglass Piper Class yacht, Sandpiper, was built in wood at the beginning of 1966 and competed in the famous Clyde Week regatta that summer.

The yard continued to operate for a further 14 years assembling a wide range of GRP (fibreglass) boats such as Pipers, Ohlsons, Etchells and Pilot Launches. Dennis Healey's ill-conceived increase in VAT from 8% to 25% on luxury goods in 1974 had a disastrous effect on yachting.  Even though this punitive tax was reduced to 12.5% in 1976 the damage was irreparable and many small boatyards went out of business. The rising cost of oil and resin along with strong competition from the more established GRP yards down south finally brought boatbuilding to a close in 1980. Buildings in the lower yard were finally pulled down in the late 1980s, and the site was levelled for re-development. All that was left of the original yard was the slipway and the boats that were once launched from it. Houses have now been built in the upper yard, and the lower yard site became incorporated in the new Holy Loch Marina development during 2009.

Alexander Robertson Legacy 
Alexander Robertson's contribution to the world of yacht-building and yachting is perhaps best summed up by the various newspaper tributes paid to him following his death in 1937:

 "Mr Robertson’s success in the yachting world had been won because he laid down the first rule that everything that went out of his yard must be of the very best".
 
 "Not only was he eminent as a designer and builder of yachts, but he also took an active part in the sport of yachting, especially in his younger years".
 
 "He has left an enduring monument to his memory in the yacht-building yard which is the creation of his genius; the permanent result of his courage and industry".
 
 "The men who worked at the yard were among the finest craftsmen in the world. They were not just boat-builders but artists in wood".
 
 "Today Robertsons of Sandbank is a household word in the world of yachting and yacht-building".

The beautiful yachts, still sailing, are a lasting testament to the vision of Alexander Robertson, the skill of his craftsmen, the expertise of the Clyde's finest designers and the dedication of owners who have managed to preserve their traditional yachts for the enjoyment of future generations.

Tables - boats and designers 
A total of 482 numbered boats (1889-1980) were built at the yard, according to the yard build-book.  However, in addition, around 200 smaller boats (mostly under 15 ft) were also built: fishing skiffs; rowing boats; sailing dinghies; tenders (gigs); sailing lifeboats; motorised lifeboats.

Classic wooden boats
A wide range of Classic Wooden Boats were built at Robertson's Yard.

In addition to the series of Classic Boats above, there were many 'one-off' Classic Boats which were built at Robertson's Yard.

Designers (wooden boats) 

Robertson's Yard built boats were designed by many famous naval architects throughout its history, among them, David Boyd who joined the yard in 1929.

Note - The above counts for Alexander Robertson and David Boyd are probably understated - some of their boat designs were attributed to 'the builder', by Lloyd's Register.

GRP boats
The table provides a summary of the main classes of GRP boats fitted-out (hull purchased elsewhere), or built at the yard.

Classic wooden Robertson boats still sailing.

This section has been included to provide an up to date list of all wooden boats that are still sailing or undergoing/awaiting restoration.

Key : c = cruising yacht, r = racing yacht, m = motor boat, o = other

Robertson's Yard time line - key events
The table provides a time line for key events in the history of the yard.

Yachting history - emergence of the Clyde and Robertsons Yard
This section provides a brief history of yachting in the UK and attempts to put the emergence of the Clyde and the story of Robertson's Yard in context.

During the early part of the 17th century sailing for 'private pleasure' began in the Netherlands. However, it was only after King Charles II of England returned from exile in the Netherlands in 1660, and was presented with a yacht named Mary, did sailing begin on the Thames.  Prior to this time the word 'yacht' was completely unknown in England. The first yacht race, which was patronised by the royal court, took place on the Thames in 1662. It is believed that due to Royal connections, private sailing started to become popular in Cork during the late 17th century.  The first yacht club in the world, 'The Water Club of the Harbour of Cork', was established in 1720. This famous club was subsequently reformed and went on to become the Royal Cork Yacht Club in 1831.

In the 18th century yachting in Britain was a very much an exclusive sport enjoyed only by the very rich, aristocrats and Royalty. From the middle to the end of the 18th century some races took place, but yachting developed very slowly.

During the 19th century yachting became a much less exclusive sport.  Although there were only a few yachts over 35 tons at the start of the century, the British yacht fleet increased dramatically from around 50 in 1812, to 500 in 1850 and 2,200 by 1902.

The first yacht club in England was formed out of the Cumberland Society fleet in 1775 and went on to become the Royal Thames Yacht Club in 1830. The Yacht Club of Cowes was founded in 1815, which became the Royal Yacht Squadron in 1833.  Regular weekly races were being organised at Cowes from 1826.  Although yachting started on the Thames, the Solent became a much more popular venue by the middle of the 19th century.  The first American yacht arrived in Cowes in 1851, which heralded the start of sailing as an international sport, and was a precursor to the America's Cup.

The first yacht club on the Clyde was the Northern Yacht Club, which appeared in 1824 and received its Royal Warrant in 1831.  The club was founded to organise and encourage the sport, and by 1825 Scottish and Irish clubs were racing against each other on the Clyde. However, it was not until 1856 and the foundation of the Clyde Model Yacht Club (which later became the Royal Clyde Yacht Club) that regular weekly races took place.  The Royal Yacht Club became a driving force of Clyde yachting, as three leading designers: William Fife III, George Lennox Watson and Alfred Mylne were among their members.  The two senior clubs on the Clyde, the Royal Northern and the Royal Clyde, were amalgamated in 1978 to become the Royal Northern and Clyde Yacht Club.

The first recorded Clyde racing yacht, a 46-ton cutter, was built by Scotts of Greenock in 1803. Scottish yacht designer William Fife started designing yachts as early as 1807, but his first large yacht Lamlash, a 50-ton yawl, was not completed until 1812.  This was the first Scottish yacht to cruise in the Mediterranean.

The rapid growth of Glasgow as an industrial city at the beginning of the 19th century was a direct result of an early project to deepen the Clyde, which was completed in 1812. The Industrial Revolution and growing overseas trade brought great wealth to the region.   Many wealthy industrialists bought houses along the coast, away from all the pollution of the big cities, and developed a great passion for yachting.

However, yacht building and yachting didn't really take off on the Clyde until the middle of the 19th century.  During the 1850s' the new sailing clubs were very active and William Fife & Sons dramatically increased the rate of building yachts at Fairlie from 2 to 5 per year.  During the 1860s' the yard had become well established and building increased from 5 to 9 yachts every year.  By the end of the century a series of yachts had been designed specifically for sailing on the Clyde: 17/19; 19/24;  restricted.

The creation of the International Yacht Racing Union and the International Rule in 1907 provided a big boost to yacht building in the early part of the 20th century, and prior to World War I, the British yachting fleet had grown to around 3,900.  The emergence of a group of talented Clyde yacht designers such as William Fife III, George Lennox Watson, Alfred Mylne, James McGruer and David Boyd in the first half of the 20th century firmly established the pre-eminent position of Clyde yachts on the high seas. The River Clyde became, like Cowes and Kiel, a centre for yachting.

References
Specific

General
'The Robertson Boat-Builders of Skye', by D Hutchison, the origin of the boat-building Robertsons from Sandbank, Clan Donnachaidh Annual 2012
'The Royal Clyde Yacht Club', by David Hutchison, History Scotland Magazine, October 2017
Lloyd's Register of Yachts: register of yachts 1878–1980; historical research service.
National Register of Archives (NRA). Robertsons Yard documents and information held at the Argyll & Bute Council Archives in Lochgilphead.
Robertsons Yard 'Slip Boat List', access kindly provided by Peter Collyer.
'The Yachtsman', yachting magazine, 1891–1915.
National Library of Scotland (NLS), newspapers and company archives
Argyll & Bute Library HQ, Sandbank, Argyll, Scotland. Local studies, history and research.
Lifeboat information, RNLI Heritage Trust
History of the Pipers, Piper One Design website
The Piper Calls the Tune - the story of David Boyd and his Piper One design by Euan Ross & Bob Donaldson, 2016. 
History of the Loch Longs, 'Loch Longs, the first fifty years', by John McMurtie, 
RAF marine craft research, Terry Holthan co-author of RAF Marine Craft Directories.
History of the Robertson built Fairmile MLs/MGBs/MTBs, World Naval Ships Forums website
'Fast and Bonnie - A History of William Fife & Son Yachtbuilders', by May Fife McCallum, 2002.
'Sandbank War and Peace – a Scottish Village 1914-1948', by Ann Galliard 2005, Argyll Publishing 
'Sandbank - Our Village', produced and published by Sandbank Community Council, 1996.
'Sandbank - Life and Times of the Village by the Holy Loch', by Ann Galliard 2009.
'Centenary of Sandbank Yachtbuilding 1876-1976', The Cowal Watchman special centenary edition, December 1976.
'Fond Memories of a Bygone Age', article about the closure of the yard, Dunoon Observer & Argyllshire Standard, 20 Feb 1993.
Robertson's Yard display board at the Castle House Museum, Dunoon
Robertson family private archives.

External links
National Register of Historic Ships

Yachts
British boat builders
Yacht design firms
Manufacturing companies of Scotland
America's Cup yacht builders
Companies based in Argyll and Bute
Manufacturing companies established in 1876
Manufacturing companies disestablished in 1980
1876 establishments in Scotland
1980 disestablishments in Scotland
British companies established in 1876
British companies disestablished in 1980